Goodenia lunata, commonly known as stiff goodenia, is a species of flowering plant in the family Goodeniaceae and is endemic to inland Australia. It is a ascending or low-lying herb with linear to egg-shaped leaves, small racemes of yellow flowers, and more or less spherical fruit.

Description
Flowering mainly occurs from March to September and the fruit is a more or less spherical capsule  in diameter.

Taxonomy and naming
Goodenia lunata was first formally described in 1927 by John McConnell Black in the Transactions and Proceedings of the Royal Society of South Australia. In 1990, Roger Charles Carolin selected the specimens collected by John Burton Cleland at Cordillo Downs as the lectotype, noting the poor condition of the type specimens. The specific epithet (lunata) means "crescent-shaped", referring to part of the fruit.

Distribution and habitat
Stiff goodenia grows in a variety of communities in inland Australia, often on grassy plains but also near watercourses and roadsides. It is mostly found in the Northern Territory, South Australia and Queensland, but also in scattered populations in Western Australia, New South Wales and Victoria.

Conservation status
This goodenia is listed as of "least concern" under the Queensland Government Nature Conservation Act 1992 and the Northern Territory Government Territory Parks and Wildlife Conservation Act 1976, but as "Priority One" by the Government of Western Australia Department of Parks and Wildlife and as "vulnerable" under the Victorian Government Flora and Fauna Guarantee Act 1988.

References

lunata
Flora of South Australia
Eudicots of Western Australia
Flora of the Northern Territory
Flora of Queensland
Flora of Victoria (Australia)
Flora of New South Wales
Plants described in 1927
Taxa named by John McConnell Black